Soul Talkin' is an album by the American musician Brenda Russell, released in 1993.

The single "No Time for Time" peaked at No. 47 on Billboard'''s Adult Contemporary chart.

Production
The album was produced by Russell, who cowrote or wrote every song but one. She spent two years working on Soul Talkin; it was the first time Russell had produced an album entirely on her own.

Critical reception

Entertainment Weekly called the album "a crafty collection of Caribbean, Brazilian, and jazzy pop," writing that "not since her 1979 debut has Brenda Russell sounded so good, so right." The Sun Sentinel thought that "it's fine adult contemporary radio fare, but if Russell wants a serious crack at the charts, she needs to loosen up and really swing." The Washington Post determined that Russell "wraps her songs in so many synthesizers and harmony vocals that she smothers them," while noting that her true talent remains her songrwriting.

The Los Angeles Times opined that "the highlight is the appearance of Bobby Caldwell—another gutsy singer—on the gently romantic 'Who Are You?'" USA Today declared that Russell is "a gifted composer," writing that "her infectious pop melodies enrich the album." The Orange County Register deemed the album "compelling, if slick, R&B pop/balladry."

Track listing

 Personnel 
 Brenda Russell – vocals, vocal arrangements, arrangements (1, 2, 3, 7, 8, 9), backing vocals (2, 3, 6), synth strings (5), guitar synthesizer (5), synthesizers (7)
 Jeff Hull – keyboards (1, 4), synthesizer programming (1, 4), drums (1, 4), drum programming (1, 4), arrangements (1, 4), keyboard programming (9), intro sound effects (9)
 Russell Ferrante – acoustic piano (2, 10), acoustic piano solo (3)
 Greg Phillinganes – keyboards (2)
 William "Smitty" Smith – Rhodes piano (2, 3), keyboards (6), organ (6), backing vocals (6)
 Brad Cole – synthesizers (2, 7, 8), additional synthesizers (3), synth flute (5), synth percussion (6), keyboard programming (7, 8), drum programming (7, 8), arrangements (7, 8), drums (8)
 David Swanson – synthesizers (2, 6), backing vocals (6)
 Aaron Zigman – synthesizers (3)
 Michael Ruff – acoustic piano (5)
 Larry Williams – additional synthesizers (5), synth solo ending (5)
 Ivan Lins – synthesizers (9), percussion (9), vocal solo (9), arrangements (9)
 James Harrah – acoustic guitar (1), guitars (3, 8)
 Ricardo Silveira – acoustic guitar (2, 4, 5), guitars (9)
 Marlo Henderson – guitars (3)
 Don Griffin – guitars (6)
 Michael Thompson – guitars (7)
 Bill Sharpe – electric bass (2), bass (3), backing vocals (6)
 Abraham Laboriel – bass (6)
 John Leftwich – acoustic bass (10)
 Alvino Bennett – drums (2, 6)
 Carlos Vega – drums (3, 10)
 Lenny Castro – percussion (2, 3)
 Luis Conte – percussion (6)
 Cassio Duarte – percussion (9)
 Mike Shapiro – percussion (10), arrangements (10)
 Everette Harp – saxophones (2)
 Scott Mayo – saxophones (2)
 Reggie Young – trombone (2)
 Michael "Patches" Stewart – trumpet (2)
 Tollak Ollestad – harmonica (4)
 Gary Herbig – woodwinds (5)
 Dan Higgins – woodwinds (5)
 Kim Hutchcroft – woodwinds (5)
 Bob Tricarico – woodwinds (5)
 Jerry Hey – woodwind arrangements (5)
 Steve Lindsey – arrangements (8)
 Bill Cantos – arrangements (10)
 Maxayn Lewis – backing vocals (1, 2, 3, 6, 8)
 Arnold McCuller – backing vocals (1, 8)
 Joe Turano – backing vocals (1, 6, 8), acoustic piano (6), additional synthesizers (6)
 Mica Paris – vocal inspiration (1)
 Petsye Powell – backing vocals (2, 3, 6)
 Paulette Brown – backing vocals (3, 6)
 Amanda Hayley – backing vocals (3)
 Carol Perry – backing vocals (4, 7, 9)
 Darlene Perry – backing vocals (4, 7, 9)
 Lori Perry – backing vocals (4, 7, 9)
 Sharon Perry – backing vocals (4, 7, 9)
 Rita Coolidge – backing vocals (6)
 Louis Price – backing vocals (6)
 Mary Wilson – backing vocals (6)
 Dianne Brooks – backing vocals (8)
 Pauline Wilson – backing vocals (8)
 Bobby Caldwell – vocals (10)

 Production 
 Brenda Russell – producer 
 Ron Fair – executive producer 
 Tommy Vicari – recording, mixing 
 Fletcher Dobrocke – recording (2, 3, 5, 6)
 David Ahlert – additional recording (1, 3, 10)
 Jeffrey "Woody" Woodruff – additional recording (2, 6), recording (7, 8, 9)
 Tony Phillips – additional recording (2, 5, 6)
 Erik Hanson – additional recording (3)
 Micajah Ryan – additional recording (3)
 Randy Long – assistant engineer (1-5, 7)
 Judy Kirschner – recording assistant (2, 3)
 Scott Ralston – recording assistant (2)
 Jeff Shannon – recording assistant (2, 5)
 Bernie Grundman – mastering 
 Debbie Wolinsky – production assistant
 Henry Marquez – art direction 
 Lu Ann Graffeo – design 
 Daniela Federici – photography 
 Kim Nickerson – personal assistant 
 Tanya Gill – stylist 
 Roberto Leon – hair stylist 
 Rudy Calvo – make-upStudios'''
 Recorded at Pacifique Studios and Track Record Studios (North Hollywood, California); Cherokee Studios (Hollywood, California); Studio 56, Walt Tucker Studio and Willyworld (Los Angeles, California); Take One Studios (Burbank, California).
 Mastered at Bernie Grundman Mastering (Hollywood, California).

References

Brenda Russell albums
1993 albums
EMI Records albums